Tharali Legislative Assembly constituency is one of the 70 assembly constituencies of  Uttarakhand a northern state of India. Tharali is part of Garhwal Lok Sabha constituency.

Election results

2022

2018

See also
 Pindar (Uttarakhand Assembly constituency)

References

External links
  

 Chamoli
Assembly constituencies of Uttarakhand
2002 establishments in Uttarakhand
Constituencies established in 2002